Javad Yasari (born March 14, 1945) is an Iranian Street singer of popular music.

He comes from the South of Tehran, and started singing in 1972 with the song called Black Money. He released five albums in Iran before the 1979 Iranian Revolution.

Discography

Studio albums

Currently available albums include:
Classics on Taraneh Records:
Asire Gham (1985)
Bacheha
Haft Asemoon (2008)
Sepideh Dam
Pop on the Pars label:
Bot (2007)
Eshghe Man (Nov 2008)

References

1945 births
Living people
People from Tehran
Iranian pop singers
Iranian male singers
Iranian folk singers
Persian-language singers
Iranian male sport wrestlers
20th-century Iranian male singers
21st-century Iranian male singers